Helen C. Murray (born 3 September 1990) is a New Zealand neuroscientist and ice hockey forward who currently serves as captain of the New Zealand national team. She made her debut with the senior national team at the 2013 IIHF Women's World Championship Division II, and was named captain in 2016. Her research focuses on Alzheimer's disease, where she splits her time between the American National Institutes of Health and the University of Auckland Centre for Brain Research. Her 2017 doctoral thesis was titled Plasticity in the Human Alzheimer’s Disease Brain.

References

External links
 

1990 births
Living people
New Zealand ice hockey players
New Zealand neuroscientists